Sendim e Atenor is a civil parish in the municipality of Miranda do Douro, Portugal. It was formed in 2013 by the merger of the former parishes Sendim and Atenor. The population in 2011 was 1,487, in an area of 58.93 km2. Sendim is in the area where the rare Mirandese language, related to Leonese, is spoken and co-official with Portuguese.

References

Freguesias of Miranda do Douro